Ustjuzhania is a genus of moths in the subfamily Arctiinae from southern and eastern Africa. The genus was erected by Vladimir Viktorovitch Dubatolov in 2009.

Species 
 Ustjuzhania chionea (Hampson, 1900)
 Ustjuzhania lineata (Walker, 1855)
 Ustjuzhania lineata malawica Dubatolov, 2009
 Ustjuzhania albida (Bartel, 1903)

References
Dubatolov, V. V. (2009). "Reviewing the African tiger-moth genera: 1. A new genus, two new subgenera and a species list from the expedition to Malawi by V. Kovtunovich & P. Usthjuzhanin in 2008-2009, with further taxonomic notes on South African Arctiinae (Lepidoptera, Arctiidae: Arctiinae)". Atalanta. 40 (1/2): 285–301, 352-355 (colour plates 24-27).

Spilosomina
Moths of Africa
Moth genera